Black God may refer to:

Black God (manga), a seinen manga written by Lim Dall-young
Black God (Navajo mythology), the Navajo god of fire and creator of the stars
Chernobog, the Slavic god of bad fate.